Melinda Frances Watts (née, Pickett; born July 20, 1978) is an American urban contemporary gospel artist and musician. She started her music career, in 2009, with her first studio album, People Get Ready, released by Razor & Tie. This album was her breakthrough release upon the Billboard magazine charts.

Early life
Watts was born, Melindia Frances Pickett, on July 20, 1978, in Bridgeton, New Jersey, the daughter of Franklin and Mary Pickett.

Music career
Her music career started in 2005, while her first studio album, People Get Ready, was released on July 28, 2009, with Razor & Tie. This album was her breakthrough released upon the Billboard magazine charts, while it placed on the Gospel Albums and the Heatseekers Albums charts, where it peaked at Nos. 17 and 29, correspondingly. Melinda was the 2008 winner of the Gospel Dream hosted by Matthew West.

Personal life
She is married to William Watts, and they have four children, residing in Sacramento, California, where she founded and operates the Glam Camp for Girls.

Discography

Studio albums

References

External links
Archived official website
Glam Camp for Girls

1978 births
Living people
African-American songwriters
African-American Christians
Musicians from New Jersey
Musicians from California
Songwriters from New Jersey
Songwriters from California
Razor & Tie artists
People from Bridgeton, New Jersey
21st-century African-American people
20th-century African-American people